Oued El Abid is  a wadi in the north-east of Tunisia.  
The Barrage Oued El Abid (سد وادي العبيد)  is a dam on the river at 36 ° 49 '13 "north, 10°42'11"east that was built in 2002 and holds 10 million m³.
The name of the river means wadi of the Valley of Slaves.

References

Abid
Abid